Pavel Sergeyevich Shestakov (born 30 November 1980 in Krasnoyarsk, Soviet Union) is a Russian former alpine skier who competed in the 2002 Winter Olympics and 2006 Winter Olympics.

External links
 sports-reference.com

1980 births
Living people
Russian male alpine skiers
Olympic alpine skiers of Russia
Alpine skiers at the 2002 Winter Olympics
Alpine skiers at the 2006 Winter Olympics
Universiade bronze medalists for Russia
Universiade medalists in alpine skiing
Competitors at the 1999 Winter Universiade
Competitors at the 2001 Winter Universiade
Competitors at the 2003 Winter Universiade